Veotinden is a mountain on the border of Vågå Municipality and Lom Municipality in Innlandet county, Norway. The mountain is surrounded by several other notable mountains including Styggehøbretindan and Styggehøi to the east; Blåbreahøe to the southeast; Memurutindene to the southwest; Veobreahesten, Veobretinden, and Leirhøi to the northwest; and Veopallan to the north.

The northern and southern peaks form part of the municipal border between Lom and Vågå municipalities while the middle peak lies just inside Lom municipality. The three peaks are:

Both the east and west sides of this steep, narrow mountain ridge are covered by glaciers. The Veobreen glacier is on the west side and the Styggehøbrean glacier lies on the east side.

See also
List of mountains of Norway by height

References

Vågå
Lom, Norway
Mountains of Innlandet